The NWA Tri-State Tag Team Championship was a tag team title created in 1962, and contested in the National Wrestling Alliance's Tri-State territory, which was promoted by Leroy McGuirk (Arkansas and Oklahoma) and Jack Curtis and Aurelian "Grizzly" Smith (Louisiana). For most of its existence, the title was the Tri-State version of the NWA United States Tag Team Championship.

This group of promoters existed until Bill Watts' Mid-South Wrestling bought out the majority of the Tri-State territory, and also Gil Culkin and George Gulkin's Mississippi territory, in August 1979. After Watts took over, McGuirk took the title to Oklahoma, the only part of the Tri-State territory not owned by Watts. The U.S. Tag Team Championship's name was then changed to the Tri-State Tag Title in 1980.

The title lasted until Tri-State closed in 1982, when Mid-South Wrestling took over Oklahoma from McGuirk.

Title history

Footnotes

References

National Wrestling Alliance championships
Tag team wrestling championships
United States regional professional wrestling championships